Eryngium prostratum, commonly called creeping eryngo, is a species of plant in the family Apiaceae that is native to the southeastern United States.

It is a perennial that produces blue flowers in the summer through frost on herbaceous stems.

References

Flora of North America
prostratum